Ganugapati Sree Rama Subba Rao (born 1937) is an Indian natural product chemist and a former chair of the department of sciences at the Indian Institute of Science (IISc). He is known for his researches on dihydroaromatics obtained through Birch reduction of aromatic compounds and is an elected fellow of the Indian National Science Academy, and the Indian Academy of Sciences. The Council of Scientific and Industrial Research, the apex agency of the Government of India for scientific research, awarded him the Shanti Swarup Bhatnagar Prize for Science and Technology, one of the highest Indian science awards, in 1982, for his contributions to chemical sciences.

Biography 

G. S. R. Subba Rao, born on 21 August 1937 in Kolavennu, in the south Indian state of Andhra Pradesh to Satyanarayana Ganugapati and Lakshmi, did his college studies at Andhra University from where he graduated in chemistry in 1957 and followed it up with a master's degree in 1959. Subsequently, he enrolled for doctoral studies under the guidance of L. Ramachandra Row and secured the degree of Doctor of Science in 1962 and moved to University of Manchester for his post-doctoral studies at the laboratory of Arthur J. Birch. He obtained a PhD in 1966 and completed his post doctoral studies at Australian National University. On his return to India in 1971, he joined the Indian Institute of Science as a member of faculty at the department of organic chemistry where he set up his research group and served as the dean of the faculty of science, eventually superannuating from academic duties as the chair of the department. He also serves as a director of Novosynth Research Labs and Bal Research Foundation, two entities involved in scientific research.

Rao is married to Lakshmi Sita Valluri and the couple has two sons, Rama and Krishna. The family lives in Bengaluru.

Legacy 
Rao's early researches were focused on natural product chemistry and through his studies of the dihydroaromatics, he developed new protocols for synthesising aromatic compounds using Birch reduction. His contributions are reported in the synthesis of steroids and polyketides as well as the studies of the mechanistic aspects of dissolving metal reductions. His work has been documented by way of over 150 articles published in peer-reviewed journals and his writings have been cited by many authors. He has guided 28 doctoral scholars in their studies, has been associated with several journals as a member of their editorial boards and served as a council member of the Indian National Science Academy from 2001 to 2003.

Awards and honours 
The Council of Scientific and Industrial Research awarded Subba Rao the Shanti Swarup Bhatnagar Prize, one of the highest Indian science awards, in 1982. He received the Sir C. V. Raman Award of the University Grants Commission of India in 1992 and the T. R. Seshadri 70th Birthday Commemoration Medal of the Indian National Science Academy (INSA) in 1997. INSA honoured him again with the Senior Scientist Award in 2003 and the Golden Jubilee Commemoration Medal in 2004. In between, he received the Alumni Award for Excellence in Research in Science of the Indian Institute of Science in 1998. He is an elected fellow of the Indian National Science Academy and the Indian Academy of Sciences and has delivered a number of award orations including the Professor Venkataraman Memorial Lecture of the National Chemical Laboratory.

Citations

Selected bibliography

See also 
 Steroids
 Polyketides

Notes

References 

Recipients of the Shanti Swarup Bhatnagar Award in Chemical Science
1937 births
Scientists from Andhra Pradesh
Living people
Indian organic chemists
Indian scientific authors
Fellows of the Indian Academy of Sciences
Fellows of the Indian National Science Academy
Andhra University alumni
Alumni of the University of Manchester
Australian National University alumni
Academic staff of the Indian Institute of Science
20th-century Indian chemists
Telugu people
People from Krishna district